"For the Girl Who Has Everything" is a song by American boy band NSYNC. It was released as the fourth single from their self-titled debut album. It was released in August 1997, exclusively on the German market. The track was later included on the US version of their debut album.

Music video
The video premiered on terrestrial television in August 1997. The video features the band stranded on a beach, attempting to send messages to a lady, in an attempt to get her to rescue them. The video intertwines clips of the band with clips of the wealthy, yet lonely girl, who has been left at home on her birthday by her parents. The girl, being cared for by household staff, seems to have everything except love. The video was partly recorded in the north of Spain, in Santander. The version of the video included on 'N the Mix is adjusted to the remix of the song, which had Justin Timberlake sing the second verse in place of JC Chasez.

Track listing 
CD1
 "For the Girl Who Has Everything" (Radio Mix) – 3:56
 "For the Girl Who Has Everything" (Album Version) – 3:51

CD2
 "For the Girl Who Has Everything" (Radio Mix) – 3:56
 "For the Girl Who Has Everything" (Album Version) – 3:51
 "For the Girl Who Has Everything" (Unplugged) – 4:19
 "The Lion Sleeps Tonight" (Solomon Linda; Hugo Peretti; Luigi Creatore; George David Weiss; Albert Stanton) – 3:10
 "For the Girl Who Has Everything" (Video) – 4:07

Charts

Release history

References 

1997 singles
NSYNC songs
Pop ballads
Contemporary R&B ballads
Songs written by Veit Renn
RCA Records singles
1996 songs
1990s ballads
Songs written by Jolyon Skinner